Eaux Claires, also known as the Eaux Claires Music & Arts Festival, is a two-day music and arts festival that took place for four years in Eau Claire, Wisconsin. The festival took a year-long hiatus in 2019 but was expected to return in 2020, before being postponed due to the COVID-19 pandemic.

Eaux Claires was founded in 2015 by Aaron Dessner of The National and Justin Vernon of Bon Iver. During its first four years, the festival was held at Foster Farms in Eau Claire County.

Past performers include Bon Iver, The National, Paul Simon, Chance the Rapper, Lizzo, the Indigo Girls, Wilco, Sufjan Stevens, Erykah Badu, Spoon, Blind Boys of Alabama, Sturgill Simpson, Doomtree, Vince Staples, Tenement and James Blake.

On December 10, 2018, the festival organizers revealed that the festival would "take a year off" for 2019, announcing a planned relaunch of the festival on a different site with a new format slated for 2020. The festival did not take place in 2020 or 2021, but is expected to return in 2022 in a new format.

2015 
The festival was founded as what Vernon described as [more than] “all the things I hate at festivals: really loud music all the time, no breaks, bad food, all that kind of thing.".

For the inaugural year, The National closed out the main stage Friday evening followed by late night sets at the uphill stage including Lizzo and Marijuana Deathsquads. The second night was anchored by Sufjan followed by Bon Iver, who closed the festival playing songs from both of his albums along with many guest artists. The festival leveraged much of the regional infrastructure in place for the Country Jam music festival, including the Foster Farms location and the Whispering Pines campground, with school buses used as shuttles between the two, while expanding the venue to include art domes and smaller stages in an uphill field previously unused by prior festivals.

The visual and performance arts experience began the moment festival goers entered the grounds, walking under an art piece of dangling colored yarn in a work commissioned from Eric Rieger, and continued through the giant letters of the Big Eaux sign. On a side stage each day the festival opened with a performance of Ragnar Kjartansson's Forever Love, a collaborative song cycle including costumed performances from Bryce and Aaron Dessner.

2016 

The 2016 festival expanded the ideas of the first year, adding more bands and reconfiguring the grounds. A small forest stage and a second amplified stage were added atop the hill, while the downhill area changes included retiring the children's stage. Gone were the sweltering uphill art/music domes of the first year, replaced by an air-conditioned headphones dome. The Thursday night campground performances were replaced by a ticketed show in downtown Eau Claire by Phil Cook and the Guitarheels, who would also play the festival itself.

Notable performances in 2016 included the live premiere of Bon Iver's 22, A Million, and the only live performance of the Day of the Dead collaboration based on the album tribute charity album. Also new in 2016 was the inclusion of an art installation organ downhill where musicians would play unannounced performances in-between sets, and other hidden art pieces scattered around the grounds that festival goers had to seek out.

A common theme in both years of the festival was collaboration, including in the first year The Blind Boys of Alabama playing with the Lone Bellow, Amy Ray of Indigo Girls performing with Phil Cook, Sufjan Stevens playing with The National, No BS Brass Band and Bryce Dessner playing with Sufjan Stevens, Vernon playing with his old bandmate Aero Flynn and The National, and in the second year Lucius and The Staves making multiple guest appearances.

2017 

The third year was notable for having neither Bon Iver nor The National playing sets of their own music, with the members of Bon Iver presenting music from John Prine and no scheduled involvement from the Dessners' bandmates.

In early February 2017 the creative team announced an overhaul for the third iteration of the festival via a bound book named "Troix". Sent to pre-sale ticket buyers, it included both the lineup and artist statements about how the festival had evolved, with a video including festival narrator Michael Perry laying at the outset that "the river doesn't plan its course ... it finds its course", likely pointing to both internal and external forces.

One of the largest changes in 2017 included decreasing the number of stages, plus halving the number of billed bands, while bringing back several musicians from prior years—including Jenny Lewis, Phil Cook, and Vernon—under a new Artists-In-Residence cohort.

In an April 2017 interview Dessner described the idea that the festival had developed into "anti-music-festival festival", having already eschewed many of the big festival tentpoles such as dedicated VIP viewing areas, branded stages, and big-font delineated headliners. Ostensibly, resident artists were an extension of the idea in that they would be “roaming the grounds performing where and when they see fit, and joining other artists onstage, prompted or unprompted.”

Scheduled performances included Paul Simon, Chance the Rapper, and Wilco, and notable sets include Feist's only scheduled festival performance of 2017, a new Justin Vernon and Aaron Dessner collaboration entitled Big Red Machine, and a musical tribute to John Prine including the artist. Several acts including Francis and the Lights, Sylvan Esso, and many of the Artist-In-Residence such as The Staves have members returning for their third year (also Sam Amidon, S.Carey, yMusic, Chris Rosenau, Bryce Dessner) and a few returning for their second (Jenny Lewis, Midnite Express).

Additional changes included the uphill area no longer being used, a revamping and expansion of the forest trail stages, and minimal schedule overlap between band sets.

Common to prior years the focus on music-plus-arts was continued, with an online-only Troix II book outlining many of the planned pieces including the Pickup Music Project's community music space and several visual art installations.

2018 
On November 15, 2017 the fourth edition of the festival was announced and tickets went on sale immediately, alongside a cryptic 29-minute audio file Please Listen #1 that included voice recordings and music clips. A second audio collection called Please Listen #2 was released alongside several Instagram posts with videos featuring discussions about The National and Sharon Van Etten performing. The organizers later revealed that there would be no "marketed lineup" for this fourth year of the festival, though through his Twitter feed Justin declared many of the bands from the Please Listen podcasts as being highly likely, while later making note that they've not "announced anything". The week before the festival started Vernon noted "you could find out basically everyone who's playing if you really wanted to", and soon after the official Eaux Claires app started publishing playlist that seemed to confirm many of the hinted artists, though the official release of the lineup didn't occur until the day of the festival.

The final band list included headliners The National, Big Red Machine, Pussy Riot, and People's Mixtape.

Additional acts included main stage sets from Wye Oak, Serengeti, Sharon Van Etten, Kevin Morby, Moses Sumney, Noname, Phoebe Bridgers, with acoustic performances from Hiss Golden Messenger, Dirty Projectors, and late night sets from Low, Mouse on Mars, and Marijuana Deathsquads. Additionally Phoebe Bridgers, Julien Baker, and Gordi regularly made appearances similar to 2017's Artists in Residence program.

Reception for 2018 was mixed, with some fans enthusiastically embracing the model and others frustrated by the final product. In the press the reviews were also mixed, focusing on both logistical and creative components including the lack of big-name acts compared to prior years, multiple sets ending early including Big Red Machine, and scheduling concerns that led to some sets being "drowned out" by music from other stages.

Well-received elements included a hidden DJ booth in the woods, and The National's headlining set.

During the festival, a booklet was released with an interview festival organizer Michael Brown, declaring: "...We don’t want more people. We want less  people."

Post-2018 

On December 10, 2018, the festival organizers revealed that the festival would "take a year off" for 2019, with a planned relaunch of the festival on a different site with a new format in 2020. "Ultimately, we want a better experience – not just for us, but for everyone." The festival did not occur in 2019, 2020, 2021, or 2022. The future of the festival remains uncertain.

References

Music festivals established in 2015
Music festivals in Wisconsin
Eau Claire, Wisconsin